Rudolf Karsch  (26 December 1913 – 11 December 1950) was a German cyclist. He won the bronze medal in 1000m time trial at the 1936 Summer Olympics.

References

German male cyclists
1913 births
1950 deaths
Olympic bronze medalists for Germany
Cyclists at the 1936 Summer Olympics
Olympic cyclists of Germany
Olympic medalists in cycling
Sportspeople from Leipzig
Medalists at the 1936 Summer Olympics
Cyclists from Saxony
20th-century German people